James Hurrell (born 7 July 1984) is an English darts player.

Career

BDO
Hurrell reached the Last 32 of the 2015 World Masters, he played Martin Phillips and lost 3–2 in sets. He qualified for the 2016 BDO World Darts Championship and was beaten by Larry Butler in the preliminary round, During 2016 he hit a 9 dart finish against Daniel Day.
He qualified for the 2018 BDO World Darts Championship but withdrew before the tournament started.

Despite the Pandemic causing obvious delays. Hurrell has comeback well and is currently world number 1 in the World Darts Federation world rankings. He has won the Isle of Man Classic beating young prospect Luke Littler. He has also reached the final of the Welsh Open (Darts) losing to Cameron Menzies in October 2021 and the Italian Masters losing to Richard Veenstra. He was the number 6 seed in the 2022 WDF World Darts Championship which took place in April 2022 where he lost 4–0 (s) to Cameron Menzies, averaging 88.77, in the quarter-finals, However he is having a good 2022 so far by picking up the Isle of Man Classic & Scottish Open.

PDC
He competed for a tour card at the 2020 Q School to join the Professional Darts Corporation. Hurrell finished outside the rankings needed to get a PDC Tour Card.

Personal life
He is also a club cricketer of moderate standard for Moreton-in-Marsh.

World Championship results

BDO/WDF
 2016: Preliminary round (lost to Larry Butler 2–3)
 2017: First round (lost to Mark McGeeney 1–3)
 2022: Quarter-finals (lost to Cameron Menzies 0–4)
 2023:

References

External links
 James Hurrell on Darts Database

Living people
English darts players
British Darts Organisation players
People from Moreton-in-Marsh
1984 births
Sportspeople from Banbury